The Penveu is a pen-like device developed by the American company Interphase for use with digital audio-visual presentations.

History
In 1991, SMART Technologies introduced an Interactive Whiteboard, on which the image from a projector was displayed. A USB connection allowed the presenter to virtually interact with the projection. Other after-market products aimed at working with existing projectors, (Mimio and eBeam), came out after that.

Interphase Corporation (NASDAQ:INPH) was founded in 1974, and filed for initial public offering in 1984. In 2010, penveu was invented. The company developed the concepts and tested them for two years until unveiling the product at the DEMO conference in Santa Clara, California, on April 18, 2012. On May 30, 2014, it was released to the market.

Since the product is made of two electronic boards (one in the handheld pen and one in the base station), the engineering department named those two boards: the PEN and the VEU, a video enhancement unit. PENVEU became the name of the device.

On September 30, 2015, Interphase Corporation announced it has ceased operations and commenced bankruptcy proceedings.

Technology
The core of the penveu technology surrounds a camera located near the tip of the pen, but is implemented in two parts of the penveu system: the PEN, and the VEU.  
The video signal (VGA) that comes from the computer towards the display device (projector or TV monitor) is intercepted by the VEU box.  Over there, visual targets are inserted into that video stream.  Those targets include position-encoded information, related to the location of each target within the display area.  The targets are inserted as increased brightness in one frame, and reduced brightness in the next frame.  Due to the flicker fusion threshold, our eyes will not be able to observe those quick changes, and since the targets in one frame will compensate for the targets in the previous frame, our eyes will only see the "target-free" visual information.  The camera in the pen, on the other hand, subtracts consecutive frames.  As a result, the camera will only be sensitive to the targets themselves, while ignoring the "human visible" information (the content).  There is a digital signal processor (DSP) in the pen, which calculates the position of the tip based on the information retrieved from the targets detected. In the core of this technology is an engineering discipline from the area of computer science called computer vision.  Computer Vision is defined as "a field that includes methods for acquiring, processing, analysing, and understanding images and, in general, high-dimensional data from the real world in order to produce numerical or symbolic information, e.g., in the forms of decisions".  In the penveu case, this translates into the acquisition of the positioning information through the pen camera, and extracting the position of the tip relative to the displayed image based on that information, and then the interaction with the display object at that location or the dispensing on virtual ink at the location. This camera-based technology is also assisted with a MEMS-based inertial system for better accuracy and smoother performance.

As a result of the positioning targeting system being integrated with the displayed image, penveu never requires calibration.  Since the only installation required is the connection of the video (VGA) cable from the projector and computer into the penveu system, as well as USB and power—installation is very simple and does not require a professional, and the product is portable.  The product works with existing projector or flat panel display, does not require a new projector, and thus is very affordable.  Finally, it allows the presenter/teacher to move away from the display and "roam" around the classroom (or conference room), thus increasing interactivity between the presenter, audience, and content, increasing audience engagement.

Awards
Penveu received several awards since its introduction into the market, including the "Best of InfoComm 2012", the 2014 "Innovations in Design and Engineering" award and the International Society for Technology in Education (ISTE) inaugural Best of Show" award.

References

External links
 

Office equipment
Display technology
Educational technology companies of the United States
Computing input devices
Pointing devices